The Blue Danube is a 1932 British romance film directed by Herbert Wilcox and starring Brigitte Helm, Joseph Schildkraut and Desmond Jeans. Its plot, based on a short story by Doris Zinkeisen, concerns a Hungarian gypsy who leaves his girlfriend for a countess, but soon begins to suffer heartache. The Blue Danube was made in both English and German-language versions.

Plot
In a Hungarian gypsy encampment, carefree Sandor (Joseph Schildkraut) lives with his beautiful sweetheart Yutka (Chili Bouchier). Into their lives rides a blonde countess (Brigitte Helm), with whom Sandor becomes infatuated.

Yutka soon flees from her faithless lover. Sandor roams the country, searching for his lost love, but finds her too late — she now wears furs and has her own aristocratic love—and Sandor returns heartbroken to his Romany encampment.

Cast

 Chili Bouchier as Yutka  
 Brigitte Helm as Countess Gabriella Kovacs 
 Joseph Schildkraut as Sandor 
 Desmond Jeans as Johann 
 Alfred Rode and His Royal Tzigane Band as Gypsy Band 
 Patrick Ludlow as Companion 
 Léonide Massine as Dancer (credited as Masine and Nikitina)
 Nikitina as Dancer

Production
Herbert Wilcox later wrote in his memoirs that he made the film because he was frustrated from making a series of photographed stage plays. He wanted to make a "talking that did not talk - and without subtitles. Music, of course, was to be a dominant substitute for words or text". He decided to make a film with minimal dialogue.

Critical reception
Wilcox claims the reviews he received were among the worst of his career. However he said the film recovered its cost from screening in Australia alone.

In contemporary reviews, Frank Nugent in The New York Times wrote, "The chief merit of "Blue Danube," a British film now showing at the Fifty-fifth Street Playhouse, is its presentation of Alfred Rode and his Royal Tzigany Band, a group of eighteen Hungarian gypsy musicians. They play the famous Strauss waltz, some melodies by Liszt and a guitar song of Mr. Rode's composition. Not being a music critic, nor possessing one's technical vocabulary, this corner must be content to report that the selections are played in a manner that sets one's blood to pounding. But Mr. Rode and his band are not all the story of 'Blue Danube.' To be exact, they are little of it, and the rest is a sorry tale of poor editing, incoherence and an overwrought performance by Joseph Schildkraut." The critic concluded that "there is nothing in the film's acting, direction or tempo to arouse enthusiasm."

The Monthly Film Bulletin described the film as "very dated" and that it "must not be looked on as a typical example of Herbert Wilcox's production". The review concluded that neither the sound or photography were "up to modern standards".

More recently, TV Guide called it a "plodding Gypsy musical."

References

Notes

Bibliography

 Low, Rachael. The History of British Film, Volume VII. London: Routledge, 1997. .

External links
 

1930s romance films
1930s English-language films
British multilingual films
Films directed by Herbert Wilcox
Films about Romani people
Films set in Hungary
British and Dominions Studios films
Films shot at Imperial Studios, Elstree
British romance films
British black-and-white films
1932 multilingual films
1930s British films